Merveil Valthy Streeker Ndockyt (born 20 July 1998) is a Congolese professional footballer who plays as an attacking midfielder for Croatian club HNK Gorica and the Congo national team.

Club career

Early career
Born in Brazzaville, Ndockyt started his career with ACNFF in 2014. He subsequently had spells at CARA Brazzaville (also playing in the CAF Confederation Cup with the side) and AC Léopards.

Tirana
On 20 August 2016, Ndockyt moved for the first time in Europe where he signed a two-year contract with Albanian Superliga outfit Tirana. Given squad number 19, he made his first appearance for the club in championship matchday 3 against Kukësi at home, netting the equalizer with a shot outside the box as the match ended in a 2–2 draw.

Ndockyt was distinguished for his performances during the first part of the season, being an important player in the lineup. In January 2017, Ndockyt refused a call-up by Congo national team in order to be part of the team in their winter training camp in Antalya, Turkey. Later in April 2017, he scored in the first leg of 2016–17 Albanian Cup semi-final tie against Besëlidhja Lezhë which ended in a 1–1 draw; Tirana eventually qualified to the final for the first time in five years after winning 2–0 in the second leg. It was Tirana's first win after 12 winless matches.

Ndockyt scored his 5th league goal of the season in the 2–0 home win over Luftëtari Gjirokastër in the penultimate matchday to keep Tirana's survival hopes alive. The club eventually relegated for the first time to First Division after not winning in the final match against Vllaznia. In the Albanian Cup final on 31 May, Ndockyt scored a penalty kick in 112 minute as Tirana defeated Skënderbeu 3–1 after extra time to win the trophy for a record 16th time. The cup success ment the return of Tirana in European competitions after 5 years.

On 21 June, he was included in new manager Zé Maria's list for the 2017–18 UEFA Europa League first qualifying round. He played full-90 minutes in both matches, making his European debut in the process, as Tirana was knocked out by Maccabi Tel Aviv 5–0 on aggregate. Ndockyt finished his Tirana career by making 38 appearances in all competitions, scoring 7 goals.

Getafe and loans
On 10 August 2017, Ndockyt moved to La Liga side Getafe CF for €400,000, making his transfer as one of the most profiting transfers in Tirana's history. The transfer was confirmed by Tirana on 28 August, with his former side retaining part ownership.

Initially assigned to the B-side in Tercera División, Ndockyt made his first team debut on 19 February 2018, replacing Amath Ndiaye in a 3–0 home win against Celta de Vigo. On 23 August, he was loaned to Segunda División side RCD Mallorca for the season.

On 29 January 2019, Ndockyt's loan was terminated and he subsequently returned to Geta. Two days later, he was loaned to FC Barcelona B in Segunda División B, until June.

Osijek 
On 28 August 2019, Ndockyt joined Croatian First Football League side NK Osijek in a temporary deal.

On 27 July 2020 he became an Osijek player.

International career 
Ndockyt was part of the Congo national team that competed in the 2017 Africa Cup of Nations qualification.

Career statistics

Club

International

Scores and results list Congo's goal tally first, score column indicates score after each Ndockyt goal.

Honours
Tirana
Albanian Cup: 2016–17

References

External links

AFA profile

1998 births
Living people
Sportspeople from Brazzaville
Republic of the Congo footballers
Association football midfielders
ACNFF players
CARA Brazzaville players
AC Léopards players
Kategoria Superiore players
KF Tirana players
La Liga players
Segunda División players
Segunda División B players
Tercera División players
Croatian Football League players
Getafe CF B players
Getafe CF footballers
RCD Mallorca players
FC Barcelona Atlètic players
NK Osijek players
Republic of the Congo international footballers
Republic of the Congo expatriate footballers
Republic of the Congo expatriate sportspeople in Albania
Republic of the Congo expatriate sportspeople in Spain
Republic of the Congo expatriate sportspeople in Croatia
Expatriate footballers in Albania
Expatriate footballers in Spain
Expatriate footballers in Croatia